Ancita fasciculata is a species of beetle in the family Cerambycidae. It was described by Blackburn in 1893. It is known from Australia.

References

Ancita
Beetles described in 1893